Justin Simms (born 1973) is a Newfoundland and Labrador filmmaker, born in Labrador City and now based in St. John's. His first feature film was Down to the Dirt, an adaptation of Joel Hynes's novel that Simms directed and co-wrote, which was named best Atlantic feature and best screenplay at the Atlantic Film Festival. His most recent feature film adaptation is Away From Everywhere (2016), based on the Chad Pelley novel of the same name, which had its world premiere at the 2016 Cannes Film Festival as part of Telefilm Canada’s Perspectives Canada program. His non-fiction credits include the National Film Board of Canada documentaries Hard Light (2011), winner of the Founder's Prize at Yorkton Film Festival; Danny (2014), co-directed with William D. MacGillivray; and the short Hand.Line.Cod. (2016), which premiered at the 2016 Toronto International Film Festival.

References

External links

Watch documentaries by Justin Simms at NFB.ca

1973 births
Living people
People from Labrador City
Film directors from Newfoundland and Labrador
Canadian male screenwriters
Writers from St. John's, Newfoundland and Labrador
21st-century Canadian screenwriters
21st-century Canadian male writers